Hawick Linden Sevens is an annual rugby sevens event held by Hawick Linden RFC, in Hawick, Scotland. The first Hawick Linden Sevens tournament was held in 2012.

History

The first tournament was staged on 14 April 2012. This was the same day as the prestigious Melrose Sevens tournament that was won by Saracens. The intention of the Hawick Linden Sevens tournament was to give teams not invited to the Melrose Sevens a chance to play in a Sevens tournament.

As league matches need to be rescheduled this has occasionally affected the staging of the Sevens tournament over the past years.

Life Members Cup

The winner of the Hawick Sevens receives the Life Members Cup. The Player of the Tournament receives the Moira Black Trophy.

Sponsorship

The Sevens tournament of 2019 was sponsored by Wilson Signs and Hunters the Bakers.

Past winners

See also
 Hawick Linden RFC
 Borders Sevens Circuit
 Scottish Rugby Union

References 

Rugby sevens competitions in Scotland
Rugby union in the Scottish Borders